Parel (परळ) Vidhan Sabha seat was one of the constituencies of Maharashtra Legislative Assembly, in India. It ceased to exist after the delimitation of seats in 2008. Shivsena has won this seat since 1990. This was the first seat won by shivsena in its history in 1970 . Wamanrao Mahadik won this seat and was the first member of shivsena to enter in the assembly

Members of Vidhan Sabha

See also
 List of constituencies of Maharashtra Legislative Assembly

References

Mumbai City district
Assembly constituencies of Mumbai
Former assembly constituencies of Maharashtra